The Men's Hurghada International 2011 is the men's edition of the 2011 Hurghada International, which is a tournament of the PSA World Tour event International (prize money: $77,500). The event took place in Hurghada in Egypt from 14 May to 19 May. Ramy Ashour won his third Hurghada International trophy, beating Karim Darwish in the final.

Prize money and ranking points
For 2011, the prize purse was $77,500. The prize money and points breakdown is as follows:

Seeds

Draw and results

See also
PSA World Tour 2011
Hurghada International

References

External links
PSA Hurghada International 2011 website
Squashinfo Hurghada International 2011 website

Squash tournaments in Egypt
Hurghada International
2011 in Egyptian sport